São Lourenço is a freguesia (civil parish) of Cape Verde. It covers the northern part of the municipality of São Filipe, on the island of Fogo. The parish has an area of 96 km².  It is also a religious parish, its religious celebration is on August 10, day of Saint Lawrence.

Settlements
The freguesia consists of the following settlements, its population data was of the 2010 census:

Achada Mentirosa (pop: 344)
As Hortas (pop: 380)
Campanas Baixo (pop: 783)
Campanas Cima (pop: 375)
Chã de Monte (pop: 118)
Curral Grande (pop: 398)
Galinheiro (pop: 877)
Inhuco (pop: 517)
Lomba (pop: 731)
Monte Tabor (pop: 170)
Pedro Homem (pop: 315)
Pico Gomes (pop: 118)
Ponta Verde (pop: 1,072, town)
Ribeira Filipe (pop: 548)
Santo António (pop: 530)
São Domingos (pop: 315)
São Jorge (pop: 635)
Velho Manuel (pop: 604)

Demographics

Notable people
Henrique Teixeira de Sousa, a doctor and an author was native to the parish

Sports
The football/soccer club União de São Lourenço is the sports team of the parish, it is based in Curral Grande.  Another football (soccer) club is Valência based in As Hortas in the middle.

References

Geography of Fogo, Cape Verde
Parishes of Cape Verde
São Filipe, Cape Verde